Mercantile Credit Bank (MCB), is a Ugandan bank that is a tier II financial institution licensed by the Bank of Uganda, the national banking regulator.

MCB is classified as "credit institution", one of only four such institutions in this class of financial service providers in the country.

, the bank's total assets exceeded US$6.6 million (UGX:16.5 billion), with shareholders' equity of approximately US$1.6 million (UGX:4 billion). In December 2012, the total assets were estimated at US$9.9 million (UGX:25 billion) following its growth in operations.

History
MCB was registered as a Merchant Bank in 1981 and commenced operations in 1986. Following the review of the banking laws in Uganda that led to the financial Institutions Act of 2004, MCB was categorised as a Tier II Institution. As a tier II financial institution, MCB is allowed to establish customer savings and fixed deposit accounts and other core banking products including provision of credit facilities, fund transfers and foreign exchange trading given the nature of its licence.

Branch network

MCB maintained its branch headquarters at Plot 8 Old Portbell Road, in Kampala's central business district. The institution's outreach strategy is supported by the Agency Banking model and the partnerships it has with Top Tier I Supervised financial Institutions.

See also
Banking in Uganda
List of banks in Uganda

References

Banks of Uganda
Banks established in 1986
1986 establishments in Uganda
Companies based in Kampala